New Castle is a city in Henry County, Indiana,  east-northeast of Indianapolis, on the Big Blue River. The city is the county seat of Henry County. New Castle is home to New Castle Fieldhouse, the largest high school gymnasium in the world.
The city is surrounded by agricultural land. In the past, it was a manufacturing center for the production of sheet iron and steel, automobiles, caskets, clothing, scales, bridges, pianos, furniture, handles, shovels, lathes, bricks, and flour. Starting in the early 20th century, it was known as the Rose City, at one point having 100 florists and numerous growers.<ref>Herbert L. Heller, Historic Henry County, vol. 3: 1880-early 1940s), pp. 329-331.</ref>

According to the 2010 census, the population was 17,396.

New Castle Correctional Facility, with a capacity of over 3,500 inmates, is located just north of the city.

History
New Castle was platted in 1823, and named after New Castle, Kentucky. A post office was established at New Castle in 1823.
The Maxwell automobile factory, later owned and operated by Chrysler Motor Corp. was, at the time of construction (1907), the largest automotive manufacturing plant in the nation.

The Chrysler Enclosure, Gen. William Grose House, Henry County Courthouse, and New Castle Commercial Historic District are listed on the National Register of Historic Places.

Geography

Government
New Castle is a third class city and has a seven-member city council chaired by the mayor. One council member is elected from each of the city's five districts and two are elected at-large. The clerk-treasurer and city judge are also elected offices. City elections are held every four years in the year preceding presidential elections.

The mayor is elected by popular vote and appoints the police chief, fire chief, city attorney, and department heads of the various municipal agencies. 
 List of mayors of New Castle, Indiana

Demographics

2020 Census
As of the census of 2020,  there were 17,396 people, 6,951 households, and 2,701 families living in the town. The racial makeup of the county was 92.1% White, 1.8% African American, 0.5% Asian, 0.03% Native Hawaiian or Pacific Islander, 0.2% Native American or Alaska Native, 0.1% from other races, and 0.4% from two or more races. Hispanic or Latino of any race were 0.3% of the population.

There were 6,951 households, 40.5% were married couples living together, 31.5% had a female householder with no husband present, 19.6% had a male householder with no wife present, and 8.4% were non-families. 51.1% of all households were made up of individuals. The average household size was 2.50 and the average family size was 3.09.

30.5% of the population had never been married. 43.1% of residents were married and not separated, 7.2% were widowed, 17.7% were divorced, and 1.6% were separated.

The median age in the city was 39.2. 5.8% of residents were under the age of 5; 23.9% of residents were under the age of 18; 76.1% were age 18 or older; and 17.9% were age 65 or older. 9.4% of the population were veterans.

The most common language spoken at home was English with 98.8% speaking it at home, 0.6% spoke Spanish at home, 0.5% spoke other Indo-European languages, 0.1% spoke other languages. 0.3% of the population were foreign born.

The median household income in Henry County was $42,803, 23% less than the median average for the state of Indiana. 20.7% of the population were in poverty, including 26.8% of residents under the age of 18. The poverty rate for the town was 7.8% higher than that of the state. 23.3% of the population were disabled and 8.5% had no healthcare coverage. 47.6% of the population had attained a high school or equivalent degree, 19.9% had attended college but received no degree, 7.5% had attained an Associate's degree or higher, 8.8% had attained a Bachelor's degree or higher, and 5.4% had a graduate or professional degree. 10.8% had no degree. 51.6% of New Castle residents were employed, working a mean of 40.4 hours per week.

2010 census
As of the census of 2010, there were 18,114 people, 7,769 households, and 4,660 families residing in the city. The racial makeup of the city was 95.1% White, 1.9% African American, 0.2% Native American, 0.4% Asian, 0.6% from other races, and 1.8% from two or more races. Hispanic or Latino of any race were 1.7% of the population.

There were 7,769 households, of which 30.1% had children under the age of 18 living with them, 39.0% were married couples living together, 16.1% had a female householder with no husband present, 4.9% had a male householder with no wife present, and 40.0% were non-families. 34.9% of all households were made up of individuals, and 15.8% had someone living alone who was 65 years of age or older. The average household size was 2.29 and the average family size was 2.93.

The median age in the city was 39.5 years. 23.4% of residents were under the age of 18; 8.8% were between the ages of 18 and 24; 24.7% were from 25 to 44; 26.4% were from 45 to 64; and 16.7% were 65 years of age or older. The gender makeup of the city was 46.7% male and 53.3% female.

2000 census
As of the census of 2000, there were 17,780 people, 7,462 households, and 4,805 families residing in the city. The racial makeup of the city was 96.37% White, 1.85% African American, 0.22% Native American, 0.21% Asian, 0.02% Pacific Islander, 0.41% from other races, and 0.91% from two or more races. Hispanic or Latino of any race were 1.09% of the population.

There were 7,462 households, out of which 28.9% had children under the age of 18 living with them, 46.7% were married couples living together, 13.8% had a female householder with no husband present, and 35.6% were non-families. Some 31.5% of all households were made up of individuals, and 15.3% had someone living alone who was 65 years of age or older. The average household size was 2.32 and the average family size was 2.90.

In the city, the population was spread out, with 23.5% under the age of 18, 8.6% from 18 to 24, 28.9% from 25 to 44, 21.8% from 45 to 64, and 17.3% who were 65 years of age or older. The median age was 38 years. For every 100 females, there were 88.7 males. For every 100 females age 18 and over, there were 84.3 males.

The median income for a household in the city was $30,688, and the median income for a family was $37,463. Males had a median income of $32,624 versus $20,554 for females. The per capita income for the city was $17,587. About 10.6% of families and 12.4% of the population were below the poverty line, including 15.7% of those under age 18 and 9.2% of those age 65 or over.

Education
 New Castle Community School Corporation
 New Castle Career Center
 Ivy Tech Community College

The city has a public library, the New Castle-Henry County Public Library.

Other attractions

 Nine of the eleven largest high school gyms in the United States are in Indiana. The largest of these is the New Castle Fieldhouse at New Castle High School. The fieldhouse has a capacity of 9,325. The fieldhouse is notable for a 1961 State Sectional Game between New Castle and Lewisville (now part of South Henry School Corporation) in which the fans attending the game were snowed in. The next morning food was delivered to the Fieldhouse by a local bakery and a church service was piped into the gym. The gym has also played host to the 2006 Indiana Class 3A Basketball Champs and the 2007 Class 4A Volleyball Champions.
 Indiana Basketball Hall of Fame is located near New Castle High School.
 Next to New Castle High School is a Native American mound dated to approximately 2000 BP. This mound contains depressions which align to sunrise/sunset during the equinoxes as well as aligning with depressions in similar mounds tens of miles away. A mound complex (from between 800 B.C. and A.D 1400) was discovered on Elliott Avenue, and the more extensive "New Castle Site" is north of the city, on the east side of the Blue River 
 Thornhaven Manor, built in 1845, is advertised as "a curious haunt" and featured on the Travel Channel's Ghost Adventures, Ghost Adventures Aftershocks, and Destination America's Ghost Brothers. Address is 2172 Spiceland Road, New Castle. Built in Italianate architectural style, it was thought to be a stop on the Underground Railroad.

 International relations 
The town attended a World Summit of towns called Newcastle'' held in Newcastle-under-Lyme in England for six days from 17 June 2006

Notable people
 Steve Alford, NCAA basketball player and coach
 Tom Allen, NCAA head football coach 
 Dakoda Armstrong, automobile racing
 Trey Ball, baseball player
 Kent Benson, NBA basketball player
 Major General Omar Bundy, United States Army officer who fought in the Indian Wars, the Spanish–American War, and World War I, where he commanded the 2nd Division in 1918
 Trevor Chowning, pop artist and former Hollywood talent agent/producer
 Richard Crane, actor
 William Grose, American Civil War general
 Tracy Hines,  NASCAR Craftsman Truck Series and United States Auto Club driver
 Vern Huffman, basketball and football player for Indiana University
 Robert Indiana, artist
 Fred Luddy businessman  
 Peter Malnati, golfer
 David Lee Roth, singer

Climate
Climate is designated as Humid continental, and this region typically has large seasonal temperature differences, with warm to hot (and often humid) summers and cold (sometimes severely cold) winters. The Köppen Climate Classification subtype for this climate is "Dfa". (Hot Summer Continental Climate).

References

External links
 City of New Castle, Indiana website

News and media
 The Courier-Times
 WMDH 102.5 FM

 
Cities in Indiana
Populated places established in 1822
Cities in Henry County, Indiana
Micropolitan areas of Indiana
County seats in Indiana
1822 establishments in Indiana